Just the 3 of Us is a 2016 Philippine romantic comedy-drama film directed by Cathy Garcia Molina with a script developed and written by the collaboration of Kiko Abrillo, Gillian Ebreo, Katherine Labayen, and Vanessa R. Valdez, and was produced by ABS-CBN Film Productions. The film stars John Lloyd Cruz, and Jennylyn Mercado with a special participation of Richard Yap. It was released on May 4, 2016, under Star Cinema.

The film marks Cruz and Mercado's first movie project together. In Just the 3 of Us, Jennylyn plays a flight stewardess who is deeply infatuated with a pilot played by John Lloyd. The film was a critical and commercial success earning  worldwide.

Synopsis
The film revolves around Uno Abusado (John Lloyd Cruz) and CJ Manalo (Jennylyn Mercado) who are both involved in the airline industry. The former is an airline pilot who aspires to be a captain and the latter is part of the ground crew who aspires to be a flight attendant. After a one night stand the two were forced to live together to deal with each other's contrasting personalities with Manalo now pregnant and claiming that Abusado is the father of her unborn child.

Cast
John Lloyd Cruz as First Officer Juan Paulo "Uno" Abusado
Jennylyn Mercado as Clara Josefa "CJ" Manalo
Richard Yap as Captain Alexander "Alex" Gatchalian
Joel Torre as Arturo Manalo
Billy Roque as Jill
Ketchup Eusebio as Tyson
Maria Isabel Lopez as Lulu Manalo
Joem Bascon as BJ Manalo
Yana Asistio as Pauline
Victor Silayan as Tim
Fifth Solomon as Felix
Manuel Chua as AJ Manalo
PJ Endrinal as DJ Manalo
Michael Agassi as Dexter
Josef Elizalde as Jerome
Jed Montero as Daisy
Lucas Maggalang as FJ Manalo
Paulo Angeles as EJ Manalo
Baron Geisler as Marco
Chun Sa Jung as Hopia

Release
The film's theatrical release was initially scheduled in March 2016. The scheduled released was moved to April 27, 2016, and later to May 4, 2016, to achieve simultaneous international screenings. The film was also simultaneously released internationally in selected cinemas in Australia, Canada, Malaysia, New Zealand, Singapore and the United States, as well as in the Middle East, Europe and Saipan in the Northern Mariana Islands.

Marketing
In late February 2016, the trailer for the film was released. The title of the film was revealed to the public through the trailer. Earlier, Jennylyn Mercado posted an image of her with John Lloyd Cruz at her official Facebook page announcing to the public of a then-upcoming Star Cinema film where she and John Lloyd Cruz would be paired together.

The official theatrical poster of Just the 3 of Us was released through Star Cinema's Instagram account on March 27, 2016. Jennylyn Mercado and John Lloyd Cruz made live appearance and also made guest appearances in GMA and ABS-CBN, their respective networks, to promote the film.

Music
The official theme song of the film is "Getting To Know Each Other" and was recorded by It's Showtime host Billy Crawford. The music video for the song premiered on April 5, 2016, via Star Music's YouTube channel. The music video stars real life couple Billy Crawford and Coleen Garcia.

Reception

Box office
As of June 2016, Just the 3 of Us has grossed  worldwide.

Philippines
The film opened in the Philippines on May 4, alongside Viva Films' This Time. This was confirmed on Mico del Rosario's Instagram account. On May 9, it breached the  mark in the box office, the 3rd Filipino film in 2016 to reached the mark.

Other Countries
According to Box Office Mojo, on their first week of showing on	United Arab Emirates it earned $128,630 in its opening week	. While on United Kingdom it earned 	$14,437, on New Zealand it earned $3,373, and on Australia it earned $20,282.

Critical reception
Just the 3 of Us received mixed to positive reviews from film critics.

Movies Philippines gave a mixed review, saying that "Just The 3 Of Us is everything you love about John Lloyd and Jennylyn in one movie. Their charms, their ability to make people laugh effortlessly and of course their effectiveness in dramatic scenes. But it’s disappointing to see them in a Star Cinema formula, though tried and tested, it still feels tired." with a rating of 3 stars out of 5. Oggs Cruz from Rappler praised the two main actors, stating that "Cruz and  Mercado seamlessly turn their characters’ errors and dysfunctions into anchors for affection."

Just the 3 of Us is graded B by the Cinema Evaluation Board of the Philippines (CEB).

Possible sequel
Director Cathy Garcia-Molina, says that Star Cinema is planning a sequel for Just the 3 of Us if not another film starring Jennylyn Mercado and John Lloyd Cruz, following the film's box office feat.

References

External links

2016 films
Filipino-language films
2016 romantic comedy films
Philippine romantic comedy films
Star Cinema films
Films directed by Cathy Garcia-Molina